Tjandamurra (Jandamarra) "Janda" O'Shane (born 15 August 1990) is a Murri Aboriginal Australian who at age six was the victim of a fire attack whilst playing at a schoolyard in Cairns, Queensland on 10 October 1996. He is the nephew of New South Wales magistrate Pat O'Shane, and Aboriginal and Torres Strait Islander Commissioner Terry O'Shane. O'Shane's given name comes from the Aboriginal resistance fighter Tjandamurra, and is sometimes transliterated as 'Jandamurra'.

The attack, and O'Shane's struggle to survive, captivated the Australian nation, as millions followed his plight in the Australian media.

The attack
The perpetrator, Paul Wade Streeton, arrived at the school carrying a 5-litre can of petrol, and never revealed why he chose to attack O'Shane out of the group of children in the playground. Streeton drenched O'Shane in fuel, and set him alight with a cigarette lighter. O'Shane ran through the school yard with his body in flames. Hearing O'Shane's screams, school principal Michael Aitken rushed out of his office and proceeded to smother the flames with his shirt and hands.

With burns to 70 percent of his body, O'Shane was not expected to live. He required long periods recovering at the Royal Children's Hospital in Brisbane, and years of skin grafts. As most of his sweat glands were destroyed by the fire he can only sweat through his face and hands, making it difficult to play sport.

Aftermath
He became a national figure in Australia, as the country sympathised and followed his progress. The attack received publicity around the world.

Streeton was arrested and later convicted for the attack. He was sentenced to life in jail. O'Shane and his mother Jenni Patterson say they have forgiven Streeton. Pat O'Shane described Streeton's sentence as "too harsh".

Support
In 1996, boxer Lionel Rose presented O'Shane with his World Title belt, hoping to speed the youngster's recovery.

Fundraising activities took place around Australia. The current affairs program Witness, on the Seven Network, set up an appeal, and was inundated with money, chocolates, teddy bears and toys for O'Shane. The program raised in excess of $120,000, and money kept coming during following years. Australian rock band Midnight Oil played a charity concert in Cairns, Queensland in 1997, to raise money for O'Shane's recovery.

In June 1999, at the age of eight, O'Shane was awarded A$75,000 in criminal compensation in the Supreme Court of Queensland. Some commentators, including New South Wales Attorney-General Jeff Shaw, used the case to highlight inequities in the compensation laws, pointing out other cases where no physical harm was done, but much larger sums of money were issued.

Graham Richardson of the Sydney Organising Committee for the Olympic Games, gave O'Shane a position on the Torch Relay of the 2000 Summer Olympics. As he was three years below the minimum age to carry the flame, O'Shane ran with his mother.

In an interview given to The Courier Mail in 2008 to mark his 18th birthday, O'Shane said he was bemused by the enormous amount of national attention he had received in Australia. "Yeah, it's a bit strange," he said. "Sometimes I forget that all of Australia knows what happened. People still want to know how I'm going."

In 2008 O'Shane graduated from Woree State High School after completing Year 12. He and his partner have a son, Raupena  and a daughter, Ava-Marie.

References

1990 births
1996 in Australia
Australian victims of crime
Indigenous Australian people
Living people
People from Cairns